Redtown is an unincorporated community in Athens County, Ohio, United States. Redtown is located at the intersection of State Routes 13 and 685. The community is north of Chauncey and south of Jacksonville.

References

Unincorporated communities in Athens County, Ohio
Unincorporated communities in Ohio